A K M Shafiqur Rahman (known as Shafiq Tuhin; born 27 September 1975) is a Bangladeshi lyricist, music director and singer. As of 2012, he wrote about 1,000 songs. He earned the Bangladesh National Film Award for Best Lyrics for the song Choto Choto Golpo in the film Projapoti (2011) and Citycell-Channel-I Music Award in 2006, 2011 and 2013.

Background and career
Tuhin started writing lyrics in 1995. His first written song was sung by singer Shakila Zafar. In 2001, just after graduating from the University of Dhaka, he chose lyric writing as his career.

Tuhin has written songs for other singers including Runa Laila, Sabina Yasmin, Shahnaz Rahmatullah, Tapan Chowdhury and Kumar Bishwajit.

In 2012, Tuhin debuted in composing tune and lyrics for films through Onnorokom Bhalobasha.

Albums
Solo
Shopno Abong Tumi (2010)
Shafiq Tuhin Dot Com
Pobitro Prem (2013)
Anguley Angul
Chupkotha Rupkotha (2016)
Duet
Paglami (2012)

Awards
 Bangladesh National Film Award for Best Lyrics (2011)
 Channel I-Citycell Music Award (2006, 2011, 2013)
 Bangladesh Film Journalists Association Award-2002
 CJFB Performance Award-2004

References

External links
 
 

Living people
1975 births
University of Dhaka alumni
Bangladeshi lyricists
Bangladeshi male musicians
Best Lyricist National Film Award (Bangladesh) winners